Gilgit-Baltistan is inherited by people from different sects and they have a diversity of their culture, customs and traditions.
The cultural heritage of Gilgit-Baltistan, Pakistan manifests itself in local traditions, music and local dress.

Dress
The dress plays a central role in the identity of a person. Traditional clothing of the region is influenced by local culture, geography and weather.

Men's Dress
Male members of Gilgit Baltistan wear different stuff of woollen caps they consider it as an honour for them. 
Men usually wear: 
 Woollen hat 
 Shalwar kameez
 Woollen robe with long or short sleeve

Women's Dress
The most elegant part of women's dress is the traditional cap. Various types of caps are used. The most popular cap is the beautiful embroidered Iraghi cap with the traditional piece of the jewel called silsila. Many other types of caps are used in various regions.
The customs of wearing caps is also common in Gilgit Baltistan, especially during events like bridal makeup. Women usually wear:
 Iraghi cap
 Loose shalwar kameez 
 Colorful frock

Cap
The traditional cap of Gilgit Baltistan has played a major role in defining the identity of people of Gilgit Baltistan. The cap has different names in major local languages. In Shina and Khowar languages the cap is called Khoi; in Burushaski, Phartsun or Pharsen; and in Wakhi, Sekeed. The cap's design is slightly different in Baltistan and is called Nating in Balti.
The traditional hat of Gilgit-Baltistan is a soft, round-topped, men's hat, typically made of wool and found in a variety of earthy colours: brown, black, grey, or ivory. Before it is fitted and worn, the traditional hat resembles a bag with a round, flat bottom. The wearer rolls up the sides nearly to the top, forming a thick band, which then rests on the head like a beret or cap.

Design of Cap
The traditional cap is a soft round topped woollen hat. Made by local artisans, it is available in various colours. Whitecaps are most popular in the region and considered a part of the formal local dress. In many areas, people especially of the older generation, still wear the traditional cap all the time with pride. They consider it a sign of honour.
The most striking feature of the cap is the duck plume and the feather is stuck in front or side of the cap. It gives a very elegant look to the cap. It is considered a part of the formal dress cap and is used in groom's dress.

References 

Culture of Gilgit-Baltistan
Gilgit-Baltistan
Culture of Kashmir